Big Jacks Creek is a  long tributary of Jacks Creek in Owyhee County, Idaho. In 2009,  of the creek were designated as wild by the Omnibus Public Land Management Act, which also created the Big Jacks Creek Wilderness.

See also
List of rivers of Idaho
List of longest streams of Idaho
List of National Wild and Scenic Rivers

References

Rivers of Owyhee County, Idaho
Rivers of Idaho
Wild and Scenic Rivers of the United States